Andhra Pradesh Special Economic Zone or APSEZ is an Industrial special economic zone situated in  the city of Visakhapatnam, India.

Location

Details
It is a multi product SEZ and Andhra Pradesh State's largest SEZ; it spreads over 5595.47 acres.

See also
 Visakhapatnam Special Economic Zone

References

External links 

Economy of Visakhapatnam
Special Economic Zones of India
2007 establishments in Andhra Pradesh